The Car is a 1993 novel by Gary Paulsen.

Plot summary

Terry Anders is a fourteen-year-old boy living in Cleveland, Ohio whose parents didn't pay much attention to him. When both of his parents abandon him after an argument, he assembles his father's old Blakely Bearcat kit car. He decides to go on a cross-country adventure to find an uncle that he vaguely remembers. Along the way, he befriends two Vietnam veterans, Waylon Jackson and Wayne, with whom he enjoys life on the open road. This book is about their adventure together as they travel across the country. 

1993 American novels
 Novels by Gary Paulsen